Hortense Dufour (born 1946 in Saintes) is a French writer. She spent her childhood and youth in Marennes, Charente-Maritime.

Biography 
Dufour is the daughter of a French magistrate and an Italian musician. She spent three years in Madagascar and Comoros. A great traveler, she went to Europe, England, Ireland, United States, Maghreb countries, etc.

In Paris, she studied modern literature. She was devoted to writing from childhood: "I always wrote," she said. "It fell on me as Grace" .. "A day without writing has always been for me a day that has not existed My blood has become ink."

She was discovered at age 22 by publisher Jean-Jacques Pauvert.

Dufour also participated in the reading committee of Éditions Robert Laffont and collaborated with the Bayard Presse group and other magazines in the form of articles. She is the mother of three children.

She is the author of numerous novels and biographies devoted to Calamity Jane, la Comtesse de Ségur, Cleopatra, Marie-Antoinette, Nero, Colette, George Sand, Marie Stuart, Sissi, la Reine Margot, Joan of Arc and Madame de Pompadour. On this subject she declared: "Biographies are my permission to continue writing, novel is history, and history is also a novel." She was awarded the Grand prix des lectrices de Elle in 1978 for her novelLa Marie-Marraine", translated into several languages and adapted to the screen by Robert Enrico under the title . She received the Prix du Livre Inter in 1983 for her novel Le Bouchot. She presided the Prix du Livre Inter jury in May 1984. She was awarded the Grand Prix de l'Académie de Saintonge et Médaille de Chardonne in 1990 for La fille du saunier. In 2006, Le bois des abeilles won the Prix des Mouettes Offered by the General Council of Charente-Maritime. Hortense Dufour has been several times the guest of the emblematic TV program Apostrophes by Bernard Pivot. he is also the author of numerous scenarios for TF1 and FR3. The Order of Knight of Arts and Letters was presented to him in July 2010 by the Minister of Culture and Communication. She participated in several parts of the TV program  hosted by Stéphane Bern: Cléopâtre pouvait-elle échapper au suicide ? (2007), Marie Stuart : reine martyre ou manipulatrice (2007), Catherine de Médicis, l'intrigante des châteaux de la Loire (2008), Henri IV : le roi de cœur (2009), Sissi impératrice : amour, gloire et tragédie (2011) and Louis II de Bavière, le roi perché (2016).

This prize rewards a first or a second novel. It is given by Hortense Dufour to the author at the municipal library of Marennes. The six first "Prix Hortense Dufour" were:

2010: L'emprise by Sarah Chiche, Grasset
2011: Hôtel Argentina by Pierre Stasse, Flammarion
2012: Ce qu'il advint du sauvage blanc by François Garde, Gallimard
2013: Pour l'honneur de Blanche by Frédérique Volot, Presses de la Cité
2014: Moment d'un coupl by Nelly Alard, Gallimard
2015: La chance que tu as by Denis Michelis, Stock

Works 
1971: La femme buissonnière, Jean-Jacques Pauvert
1976: La dernière femme de Barbe-Bleue, Grasset, translated into German, 1977
1978: La Marie-Marraine, Grasset, Grand prix des lectrices de Elle, translated into several languages, adapted to the screen by Robert Enrico under the title L'empreinte des géants
1980: La guenon qui pleure, Grasset
1981: L’écureuil dans la roue, Grasset, adapted to cinema in 1983, by  under the title  
1982: Le Bouchot, Grasset - Prix du Livre Inter 1983
1984: Le tournis, Grasset 
1985 Jardins-Labyrinthes (with Georges Vignaux), Grasset
1986: Capitaine Dragée, Grasset
1987: Le Diable Blanc (Le roman de Calamity Jane), Flammarion
1887: La Garde du cocon, Flammarion
1989: Le Château d’absence, Flammarion
1990: Comtesse de Ségur, née Rostopchine, Flammarion - , 2002   
1992: La fille du saulnier, Grasset, Grand prix de l'Académie de Saintonge, le livre de poche
1993: La jupière de Meaux, Grasset
1995: L’arbre à perruque, Grasset
1996: Saint Expédit, le jeune homme de ma vie, Bayard presse
1996: La cinquième saison (la vie du grand chef sioux Sitting Bull), Seuil Jeunesse, 1996, Prix Enfantasia de la ville de Genève
1997: Salve Regina, Éditions du Rocher
1997: Eléonore par-dessus les moulins, Éditions du Rocher
1995: Cléopâtre la fatale, Flammarion
1998: Charivari, Seuil
1988: Le perroquet de Tarbes, Éditions du Rocher
1999: Moi, Néron, Flammarion - Poche 
2000: Colette, La vagabonde assise,  Grande Biographie, Éditions du Rocher, 
2001: Marie-Antoinette, la mal-aimée, Biographie,  Flammarion - J'ai lu, 2003 
2001: Mademoiselle Noémie, Seuil 
2001: Un si grand objet d'amour, Éditions du Rocher 
2002: George Sand la somnambule, Éditions du Rocher - J'ai lu, 2004 
2002: Au vent fou de l'esprit, Flammarion, J'ai lu, 2006 
2003: Mon vieux Léon, Seuil, 
2003: Sissi, Les forces du destin, Flammarion
2004: L'ange rose, Éditions du Rocher, 
2005: Le Bois des abeilles, Flammarion, 
2007: Marie Stuart, Grande Biographie, Éditions du Rocher
2008: Ce que l'Océan ne dit pas, Flammarion
2010: Margot, la reine rebelle, Grande Biographie, Flammarion
2012: Jeanne d'Arc, la chanson et la geste, Flammarion
2014: Ces jours heureux, Flammarion
2015: Madame de Pompadour, l’amie nécessaire, Flammarion

References

External links 
 Hortense Dufour on Babelio
 Hortense Dufour on SkyRock
 Hortense Dufour on L'Express (16 January 2003)
 Hortense Dufour on Ricochet-Jeunes
 Hortense Dufour: Marennes, c’est mon plus bel encrier on Sud Ouest
 Festival de la Biographie 2009 : Ce que l'océan ne dit pas on YouTube

20th-century French writers
21st-century French writers
French biographers
Prix du Livre Inter winners
Chevaliers of the Ordre des Arts et des Lettres
People from Saintes, Charente-Maritime
1946 births
Living people
20th-century French women writers
21st-century French women writers
Women biographers